Actinodaphne lawsonii is a species of plant in the family Lauraceae. It is endemic to India.  It is threatened by habitat loss.

See also
Rare, endangered and threatened plants of Kerala

References

lawsonii
Flora of Karnataka
Flora of Kerala
Flora of Tamil Nadu
Vulnerable plants
Taxonomy articles created by Polbot